Numerous cities, towns, villages and streets around the world are named after Armenia. Some of them are listed below.

Settlements

 
Americas
  Armenia, Colombia
  Armenia, Antioquia, Colombia
  Armenia, Belize
  Armenia, Ecuador
  Armenia, Sonsonate, El Salvador
  Nueva Armenia, Honduras
  Armenia Bonito, Atlántida, Honduras
  Armenia, Wisconsin
  Armenia Gardens Estates, Tampa, Florida
  Armenia Township, Bradford County, Pennsylvania
  Little Armenia, East Hollywood, Los Angeles, California
  Old Armenian Town, Fresno, California
 
Asia
  Armanitola, Dhaka, Bangladesh
   Armenikend, Baku, Azerbaijan (formerly)
Europe
  Armeniș, Romania
  Armenoi, Crete, Greece
  San Lazzaro degli Armeni, Italy
  Armyansk, Crimea, Russia
  Armyanskiy, Apsheronskiy rayon, Krasnodar Krai, Russia
  Armyanskiy, Krymskiy rayon, Krasnodar Krai, Russia
  Örményes, Hungary
  Ormos Armenis (Όρμος Αρμένης), Oia, Greece
  Urmeniș, Romania

Streets and squares

Other
Metro stations
 Armênia, a São Paulo Metro station

Parks
 Armenian Heritage Park, Boston, Massachusetts 
 Parc de l'Arménie, Montreal

Rivers
  Ormeniș, tributary of the Mureș in Transylvania, Romania
  Ormeniș, tributary of the Olt, Romania

Other
 Armenia Dam, in the Leeu River, near Hobhouse, Free State, South Africa

References

Places named after Armenia
Armenia